Bjarne Eriksen (30 March 1882 – 21 November 1970) was a Norwegian painter.

He was born in Copenhagen, Denmark. He was the son of Adam Emanuel Erichsen and Olea Pedersen. His brother  Sigurd Eriksen  was also a painter. 
He attended the Norwegian National Academy of Craft and Art Industry in  Oslo. He studied art under Kristian Zahrtmann in 1904 and 1905 and was also influenced by Henrik Sørensen. He was awarded both state scholarships and private endowments to study abroad. He conducted study trips to Paris in 1910 and 1919. He principally painted abstract and colorful landscapes. He is represented in the National Gallery of Norway.

References

1882 births
1970 deaths
20th-century Norwegian painters
Norwegian male painters
Norwegian expatriates in Denmark
20th-century Norwegian male artists